The Thompson Chain-Reference Bible is a Christian study Bible originally published by the Kirkbride Bible Company and now published by Zondervan.

History
The Thompson Chain-Reference system was devised by its namesake, Dr. Frank Charles Thompson, in the early 1900s, but the original work was started in 1890. Thompson was born in 1858, in Elmira, New York, and was ordained in 1879. His wife was Laura Boughton Thompson. He began work on the system because of his dissatisfaction with the reference Bibles that were then available to preachers:

Dr. Thompson believed the Bible should be presented in a simple, but scholarly way. He saw the need for a well-organized reference Bible that would be of practical use to the layman as well as a minister. In 1890, Dr. Thompson began the work he would continue for the rest of his life. He completed the "thought suggestions" opposite the verses throughout the Bible. These are what became the "chain-links" that are the heart of the Thompson system. Some of the men in Dr. Thompson's church saw his Bible and told him this would be a great help to them in their Bible study too. They encouraged Dr. Thompson to have his Bible, with marginal references, published so that everyone could enjoy the blessing of this helpful study tool.

The first version of Thompson's study Bible was published in 1908 by the Methodists Book Concern of Dobbs Ferry, New York. Five years later, in 1913, Thompson was joined by B. B. Kirkbride, of Indianapolis, Indiana. The two men formed the Kirkbride Bible Company in order to further improve and distribute Thompson's work.

The original Thompson Chain-Reference Bible, as well as several subsequent versions, were based on the King James Bible. Currently, editions based on the King James Version, New King James Version, New International Version (1978 version; now out of print), New American Standard Bible (1977 version) and English Standard Version are available, as well as electronic versions that incorporate other features.

, more than four million Thompson Chain-Reference Bibles have been sold.

On December 3, 2020, HarperCollins Christian Publishing announced its acquisition of the Thompson Chain-Reference Bible product assets from Kirkbride Bible Company. The Bible brand will be stewarded by the Zondervan publishing group.

Chains
The heart of the Thompson Chain-Reference system is Thompson's "chain topics". The system incorporates over 4,000 such chains. As an example, the entry for Amalek says:

124—AMALEK, a descendant of Esau, Ge 36:12, Ex 17:8, Dt 25:17, 1Sa 15:3, 28:18, 2Sa 1:1, 1Ch 4:43.

Genesis 36:12 has the following margin note:

124 Amalek, Ex 17:8

The "chain" continues in Exodus 17:8 which has this margin note:

124 Amalek, Dt 25:17

and so on, until 1 Chronicles 4:43 which has the margin note:

124 Amalek ‡

indicating the end of the chain. Other chains are more complex. Chain topic 3724, for example, concerns the general topic of unity:

UNITY—STRIFE
(A) UNITY of Believers.
3724—(1) In Christ.
  Ro 12:5 so in Christ we who are many form one body, and each member belongs to all the others.
  1Co 10:17 Because there is one loaf, we, who are many, are one body, for we all partake of the one loaf. (1Co 12:12)
  ...
  See Saints' Fellowship. 1325

This topic is divided into the major subtopics of "UNITY of Believers", "COOPERATION", and "STRIFE", each of which is divided into further topics. The general section contains 12 individual chains, some of considerable size. Many also incorporate references to chains treated elsewhere, such as the reference to Saints' Fellowship (chain 1325). The chain numbers feature prominently in the Thompson system, and the chain topics are listed in numerical order.

Comprehensive Bible assistance
In addition to the chain topics, the Thompson Chain-Reference Bible includes a number of other aids to Bible study:

Bible readings "including a wide range of subjects for use in private devotions and public services". These consist of individual Bible verses on a large number of specific topics, classified under more general topics.
Outline studies of the Bible "including a study of the Bible as a whole by periods and by books"
Analyses of the books of the Bible giving the origin of the name of the book, the author or authors, key words, a synopsis or analysis, and so on
Character studies including
in-depth studies of Noah, Abraham, Jacob, Joseph, Joshua, Gideon, Samuel, David, Solomon, Elijah, Elisha and Daniel
a list of prominent Bible characters
an outline history of the Apostles
portraits of Christ
chronology of Biblical prophecies
Bible harmonies and illustrated studies "including life trees, pictorial maps, charts, outlines"
Archaeological supplement, with a general introduction to Biblical archeology and an archaeological treatment of many of the places mentioned in the Bible.
Concordance
Bible maps

References

External links
 Kirkbride Bible Company–The Thompson Chain-Reference Bible
 Thompson Chain-Reference Topics
 Thompson's study Bible 1908 - IOS App

Study Bibles
Bible translations into English
King James Version editions